The chain fountain phenomenon, also known as the self-siphoning beads, Mould effect, or Newton beads is a physical phenomenon observed with a chain placed inside a jar. One end of the chain is pulled from the jar and is allowed to fall under the influence of gravity. This process establishes a self-sustaining flow of the chain which rises over the edge and goes down to the floor or ground beneath it, as if being sucked out of the jar by an invisible siphon. For chains with small adjacent beads, the arc can ascend into the air over and above the edge of the jar with a noticeable gap; this gap is greater when the chain falls further.

History 

The self-siphoning phenomenon has been known for some time, and had become a topic of public discussion many times in the past. Science entertainer Steve Spangler presented this phenomenon on TV in 2009. This phenomenon is classically known as Newton's beads.

The effect is most pronounced when using a long ball chain. The higher the jar containing the chain is placed above the ground, the higher the chain will rise above the jar during the "siphoning" phase.

The phenomenon with the rising chain was already described in 2011 as an open problem  for the 2012 International Young Physicists' Tournament (IYPT) and subsequently brought to widespread public attention in a video made by science presenter Steve Mould in 2013. Mould's YouTube video in which he demonstrated the phenomenon of self-siphoning rising beads, and his subsequent proposed explanation on a BBC show, brought the problem to the attention of academics John Biggins and Mark Warner of Cambridge University, who published their findings in Proceedings of the Royal Society about what they called "chain fountain" or "Mould effect".

Explanation 

A variety of explanations have been proposed as to how the phenomenon can best be explained in terms of kinematic physics concepts such as energy and momentum. Biggins and Warner suggest that the origin of the upward force is related to the stiffness of the chain links, and the bending restrictions of each chain joint.

Furthermore, because the beads of the chain can drag laterally within the jar across other stationary links, the moving beads of the chain can bounce or jump vertically when they strike the immobile links. This effect contributes to the chain's movement, but is not the primary cause.

See also
Catenary

References

Notes

External links 

Science demonstrations
Articles containing video clips